N. Sreekantan Nair (15 July 1915 – 20 July 1983) was an Indian politician, independence activist, trade unionist and writer who served as a Member of Parliament for Kollam.

Early life
He was born on 15 July 1915 as the only son of N. Neelakanta Pillai M.A. (Eng), (Mal), (Sanskrit). Pillai was a Principal of Government Sanskrit College, Trivandrum and authored several books in the three languages and JanakiAmma. He married activist Maheshwari Amma, daughter of freedom fighter K. K. Kunju Pillai. They have a daughter, Naja.

Education
Nair passed his S.S.L.C. from M.G.M High School, Thiruvalla in 1932. He joined the St. Berchmans College, Changanassery where he completed his Intermediate in 1934. He passed his M.A. degree in English with first class from Maharajas College (now University College, Trivandrum) in 1937.

Political life
He was a member of the State Congress in the erstwhile state of Travancore, and a founder of the Kerala Socialist Party which later merged into the Revolutionary Socialist Party. He was elected to the Lok Sabha for the first time in the General Elections of 1952 from Quilon cum Mavelikara constituency, but lost the 1957 elections to V. P. Nair. He won the next four elections (1962, 1967, 1971, 1977) representing Kollam Parliament Constituency. He devoted his political life to the trade union sector in Kerala.

Writer
He translated the book 'Kayar'(Coir) of Jnanpith winner Thakazhi Sivasankara Pillai to English. He was a board member of the Sahithya Pravarthaka Saharkarna Sanghom and member of Kerala Sahitya Akademi.

Major works
 Ithuthanne Marxism
 Aikya Keralam
 Vanchikkapetta Venad
 Ente Amma
 My Mother (Translation of Ente Amma to English)
 Maotse Tung Vansai
 Kazhinjakala Chithrangal (3 volumes)
 Sahithya Salakangal

Translations
 Coir (English) (Translation of Kayar by Thakazhi Sivasankara Pillai)
 Chalo Delhi (Malayalam)(Translation of Road to Delhi by M.Sivaram)

References

 Vekthiyum Prasthanavum Biography on him written by Navaikulam Sukumaran Nair

1915 births
1983 deaths
20th-century Indian writers
India MPs 1952–1957
India MPs 1962–1967
India MPs 1967–1970
India MPs 1971–1977
India MPs 1977–1979
Indian independence activists from Kerala
Indian male writers
Indian National Congress politicians from Kerala
Lok Sabha members from Kerala
Malayalam-language writers
Malayali politicians
Trade unionists from Kerala
Writers from Kerala
Prisoners and detainees of British India